Zuidplas is a municipality in the Netherlands located in the province of South Holland. It was established on 1 January 2010 by the joining of Moordrecht, Nieuwerkerk aan den IJssel, and Zevenhuizen-Moerkapelle. It had a population of 41,753 as of August 2017.

Topography

Dutch Topographic map of the municipality of Zuidplas, September 2014

Notable people 

 Claes Michielsz Bontenbal (1575–1623) Secretary of Zevenhuizen and conspirator
 Lia van Rhijn (born 1953) ceramist and sculptor
 Arie Slob (born 1961) politician and history teacher
 Angela Visser (born 1966) actress, model and beauty queen, Miss Universe 1989 
 Hans Spekman (born 1966) politician 
 Dirk Bruinenberg (born 1968) musician, former drummer of metal and power metal bands
 Tamara van Ark (born 1974) politician and minister

Sport 

 Jan Bazen (born 1948) former speed skater, competed at the 1976 Winter Olympics
 Brecht Rodenburg (born 1967) retired volleyball player, team gold medallist at the 1996 Summer Olympics
 Sjoert Brink (born 1981) professional bridge player
 Lars Elgersma (born 1983) short and middle distance speed skater  
 Ronald Hertog (born 1989) amputee and Paralympic javelin thrower, flag-bearer at the 2012 Summer Paralympics
 Raymond Kreder (born 1989) professional road racing cyclist
 Bastiaan Lijesen (born 1990) swimmer, competed at the 2012 Summer Olympics
 Memphis Depay (born 1994) professional footballer, over 200 club caps

References

External links 
 

 
Municipalities of South Holland
Municipalities of the Netherlands established in 2010